Zettlitz is a municipality in the district of Mittelsachsen, in Saxony, Germany.

Population history
With 668 inhabitants on 31 December 2020, Zettlitz is the second-smallest (by number of inhabitants) municipality in Saxony after Rathen with its 339 inhabitants.

 Data source: Statistisches Landesamt Sachsen

References 

Mittelsachsen